Oceania Judo Championships is the Judo Oceanian Championship organized by the Oceania Judo Union.

Tournaments

See also

2018 Oceania Judo Championships

References

External links
 

 
Judo competitions
Judo